The Te Giac Trang field (White Rhinoceros field) is an offshore oil field in the Cuu Long Basin in the South China Sea, southeast of Vũng Tàu, Vietnam. The field is located in the block 16-1.

The field was discovered in 2003. The reservoir of Miocene sandstone is estimated to have  of oil equivalent.

The development plan was approved in September 2009 and production started on 22 August 2011 by PetroVietnam jack-up platform  PVD-II.  The second platform, WHP-H4, started operations on 9 July 2012.  Sixteen production wells are connected to two wellhead platforms. Oil is collected by a FPSO while gas will be exported to the Bạch Hổ platform.  The FPSO Armada TGT 1 was converted from a Suezmax tanker by Keppel Offshore and Marine.

The field is operated by Hoang Long JOC, a partnership between PetroVietnam (41%), SOCO International (28.5%), PTT Exploration and Production (28.5%), and OPECO (2%).  Hoang Long JOC holds 50% interest in the field while rest of 50% is held by SOCO.

References 

Oil fields in Vietnam